João Pedro Pereira Silva (born 21 May 1990) is a Portuguese professional footballer who plays for C.F. Estrela da Amadora as a striker.

Club career
Born in Vila das Aves, Santo Tirso, Silva joined the youth system of local C.D. Aves at the age of 10. He eventually made his professional debut for the club during the 2009–10 season, with the northerners in the Segunda Liga, and made an immediate impact by finishing as the league's second top scorer with 14 goals as the team finished comfortably in mid-table.

Silva signed for Premier League side Everton on a three-year contract for an undisclosed fee, on 9 June 2010. In the last hours of the following transfer window, without having made any official appearances with the Toffees, he returned to Portugal, joining U.D. Leiria on loan. On 14 May 2011, the last matchday of the campaign, he scored two of his four goals in the Primeira Liga for the team, in a 3–3 away draw against S.L. Benfica.

For 2011–12, Silva continued on loan and in his country's top division, joining Vitória de Setúbal. He scored in his first competitive game, a 2–1 home win over F.C. Paços de Ferreira, netting in the 91st minute. On 31 January 2012, he was recalled from his loan.

On 9 July 2012, Silva joined PFC Levski Sofia on a three-year deal. He made his official debut ten days later, as a substitute in a UEFA Europa League qualifying match against FK Sarajevo.

Released by Levski in summer 2013, Silva took his game to Italy, where he represented A.S. Bari and U.S. Città di Palermo, the first club from Serie B and the second in the Serie A. He left the latter on 26 August 2015, signing a one-year contract with Paços de Ferreira the following day.

Silva returned to the Italian second tier in January 2016, remaining there until June 2017 in service of U.S. Avellino 1912 and U.S. Salernitana 1919. He moved back to his country subsequently, with C.D. Feirense. He scored only 13 competitive goals in a two-year spell, being relegated from the main division in 2019.

Silva competed in China the following years, with Nantong Zhiyun FC, Zibo Cuju FC (League One) and Hebei FC (Super League).

International career
Silva won his first cap for the Portugal under-21 team on 18 May 2010 – three days shy of his 20th birthday – replacing Orlando Sá for the last 21 minutes of a 3–1 friendly win over the Netherlands played in Vila Real de Santo António.

Career statistics

References

External links

Levski official profile

1990 births
Living people
People from Santo Tirso
Sportspeople from Porto District
Portuguese footballers
Association football forwards
Primeira Liga players
Liga Portugal 2 players
C.D. Aves players
U.D. Leiria players
Vitória F.C. players
F.C. Paços de Ferreira players
C.D. Feirense players
C.F. Estrela da Amadora players
Everton F.C. players
First Professional Football League (Bulgaria) players
PFC Levski Sofia players
Serie A players
Serie B players
S.S.C. Bari players
Palermo F.C. players
U.S. Avellino 1912 players
U.S. Salernitana 1919 players
Chinese Super League players
China League One players
Nantong Zhiyun F.C. players
Zibo Cuju F.C. players
Hebei F.C. players
Portugal youth international footballers
Portugal under-21 international footballers
Portuguese expatriate footballers
Expatriate footballers in England
Expatriate footballers in Bulgaria
Expatriate footballers in Italy
Expatriate footballers in China
Portuguese expatriate sportspeople in England
Portuguese expatriate sportspeople in Bulgaria
Portuguese expatriate sportspeople in Italy
Portuguese expatriate sportspeople in China